Dafna Rechter (born 15 July 1965) is an Israeli actress and singer. She is a two-time winner of the Ophir Award for Best Actress.

Early life
Rechter was born to a family of artists: She is the daughter of architect Yaakov Rechter and actress Hanna Meron, the sister of architect Amnon Rechter, logician Ofra Rechter and the half sister of musician Yoni Rechter and illustrator Michal Levit from her father's first marriage.

Private life
Rechter is a vegan, also known for her contribution to the struggle for animal rights. She is divorced and has one child, born in 1996.

Rechter was also known for the complex relationship and the conflict between her and her mother, whom she openly spoke about in the media.

Filmography
Beyond the Sea
Urban Feel

References

External links

1965 births
Living people
Israeli people of Ukrainian-Jewish descent
Israeli people of German-Jewish descent
Beit Zvi School for the Performing Arts alumni
Israeli film actresses
Israeli stage actresses
Israeli television actresses
20th-century Israeli women singers
20th-century Israeli actresses
21st-century Israeli actresses